Colonel James Forbes-Robertson  (7 July 1884 – 5 August 1955) was a British Army officer and recipient of the Victoria Cross, the highest award for gallantry in the face of the enemy that can be awarded to British and Commonwealth forces.

Forbes-Robertson was born in 1884, at Slead Hall, a Grade II listed Building, in Brighouse, West Yorkshire and was educated at Cheltenham College. During the First World War, he served as the Deputy Commanding Officer of the 1st Battalion, Royal Newfoundland Regiment and as the unit's Acting Commanding Officer during the Battle of Monchy-le-Preux in April 1917. When he was 33 years old, and an acting lieutenant colonel in the 1st Battalion, The Border Regiment, during the First World War at the Battle of Estaires, he was awarded the Victoria Cross for his actions on 11/12 April 1918 near Vieux-Berquin, France:
Four times Lieutenant Colonel Forbes-Robertson saved the line from breaking and averted a most serious situation. On one occasion, having made a reconnaissance on horseback in full view of the enemy under heavy fire, he led a counter-attack which was completely successful in establishing our line. When his horse was shot under him he continued on foot, steadying the men and inspiring confidence by his disregard for personal danger. On the second day he lost another horse and again continued on foot until he had established a line to which his own troops could withdraw.

In August 1918 he was given the temporary rank of brigadier general whilst he served as a staff officer, later reverting to his substantive rank. He later achieved the rank of colonel and transferred to the Gordon Highlanders where he ended his career.

Forbes-Robertson died in 1955 and was buried at the Bouncer's Lane Cemetery, Cheltenham.

References

External links
Location of grave (Cheltenham cemetery, Gloucestershire)
James FORBES-ROBERTSON of Cheltenham College
Image of James Forbes-Robertson wearing his medals

1884 births
1955 deaths
British Army recipients of the Victoria Cross
British Army generals of World War I
British World War I recipients of the Victoria Cross
Border Regiment officers
Companions of the Distinguished Service Order
Deputy Lieutenants of Sutherland
Gordon Highlanders officers
Graduates of the Royal Military College, Sandhurst
People educated at Cheltenham College
People from Ross and Cromarty
Recipients of the Military Cross
Newfoundland military personnel of World War I
Royal Newfoundland Regiment officers
Military personnel from Yorkshire